Mladen Jurčević (born 4 March 1983 in Travnik) is a Bosnian-Herzegovinian football midfielder playing for HNK Šibenik.

Club career
Jurčević began his career with NK Vitez in the First League of Bosnia and Herzegovina. He played for Croatian Prva HNL club NK Varteks and Bosnian-Herzegovinian club NK Čelik Zenica.

References

1983 births
Living people
People from Travnik
Association football fullbacks
Bosnia and Herzegovina footballers
NK Vitez players
NK Varaždin players
NK Čelik Zenica players
HNK Šibenik players
NK Široki Brijeg players
Premier League of Bosnia and Herzegovina players
Croatian Football League players
Bosnia and Herzegovina expatriate footballers
Expatriate footballers in Croatia
Bosnia and Herzegovina expatriate sportspeople in Croatia
Expatriate footballers in Luxembourg
Bosnia and Herzegovina expatriate sportspeople in Luxembourg